Mhamed Hachemi Baccouche, known as Hachemi Baccouche (Arabic: هاشمي بكوش),  (Tunis, January 4, 1916 – Tunis, June 9, 2008) was a Tunisian writer, humanist, and psychosociologist.  The nephew of former prime minister Slaheddine Baccouche, he was exiled in France from 1957 to 2000, but returned to Tunis in 2006.  He was a communist in his youth.

References
Jean Déjeux, Dictionnaire des auteurs maghrébins de langue française, éd. Karthala, Paris, 1984, p. 272

Writers from Tunis
Tunisian writers
Tunisian humanists
1916 births
2008 deaths
20th-century Tunisian writers
Tunisian male writers